Cove School may refer to:

Cove School, Hampshire, a community secondary school in Farnborough, Hampshire, England
Cove School (Oregon), a public charter school in Union County, Oregon, United States

See also
Cove (disambiguation)